Philip Andrew Crang, FAcSS, is a British cultural and human geographer. Since 2005, he has been Professor of Cultural Geography at Royal Holloway, University of London.

Life

Education and career 
Crang completed his undergraduate degree at Emmanuel College, Cambridge, graduating with a BA in 1986. He remained at the University of Cambridge to carry out his doctoral studies; his PhD was awarded in 1992 for his thesis "'A new service society?': On the geographies of service employment". After finishing his doctorate, Crang lectured at St David's College, Lampeter, and later moved to University College London, where he was Lecturer in Human Geography. He moved to Royal Holloway, University of London, in 2000 and took up the post of Reader in Human Geography. He was promoted to Professor of Cultural Geography in 2005.

Honours and awards 
In October 2012, Crang was elected an Academician of the Academy of Social Sciences (later renamed Fellow of the Academy of Social Sciences).

Publications 

 (Edited with Mike Crang and Jon May) Virtual Geographies: Bodies, Space, Relations (Routledge, 1999).
 (Edited with Mark Goodwin and Paul Cloke) Introducing Human Geographies (Hodder Headline, 1999).
 (Edited with Peter Jackson and Claire Dwyer) Transnational Spaces (Routledge, 2004).
 (Co-authored with Chris Philo, Ian Cook, Joe Painter, Mark Goodwin, Paul Cloke) Practising Human Geography (Sage, 2004).
 (Co-edited with Paul Cloke and Mark Goodwin) Envisioning Human Geographies (Hodder Headline, 2004).
 (Co-authored with Christopher Breward and Rosemary Crill) British Asian Style: Fashion & Textiles: Past & Present (V&A Publishing, 2010).

References 

Living people
Alumni of Emmanuel College, Cambridge
British geographers
Human geographers
Cultural geographers
Academics of the University of Wales, Lampeter
Academics of University College London
Academics of Royal Holloway, University of London
Fellows of the Academy of Social Sciences
Year of birth missing (living people)